Matthew Wren (3 December 1585 – 24 April 1667) was an influential English clergyman, bishop and scholar.

Life
He was the eldest son of Francis Wren (born 18 January 1552 at Newbold Revell), citizen and mercer of London, only son of Cuthbert Wren (d.1558), of Monk's-Kirby, in the county of Warwick, and his wife Mary, daughter of William Jenkinson. His grandfather Cuthbert Wren was the second son of William Wren, of Sherborne-House and of Billy-Hall in the bishopric of Durham. He was descended from an ancient family which came originally from Denmark. Matthew Wren's mother was Susan, daughter of William Wiffinson. His parents lived in the parish of St. Peter’s Cheap in the City of London, and had three children: a daughter Anna, and two sons; Matthew, born 1585, and Christopher, born 1589.

He was the brother of Christopher Wren, who also took holy orders, and the uncle of the prominent architect Sir Christopher Wren.

He attended Merchant Taylors' School, London, and proceeded in 1601 to Pembroke College, Cambridge, where he was a protégé of Lancelot Andrewes. He became a Fellow in 1605 and later President. He was Master of Peterhouse from 1625 to 1634. He accompanied Charles I to Holyrood Palace for his Scottish coronation in 1633, and was appointed chaplain and Clerk of the Closet. He became Bishop of Hereford in 1634, Norwich in 1635, and Ely in 1638.

However, his strong support of William Laud, Archbishop of Canterbury, and his toughness on Puritans, led to his being imprisoned in the Tower of London by the Parliamentarian faction from 1642 to 1660. Unlike Laud, he survived, and was allowed the freedom to write notes on improvements to the Book of Common Prayer, on which he later had some influence. He was deprived of his See by Parliament on 9 October 1646, as episcopacy was abolished for the duration of the Commonwealth and the Protectorate. Upon the Restoration, he was released on 15 March 1660.

While in the Tower, he vowed to devote a sum of money to "some holy and pious employment" should he be released. To fulfill this vow, he chose to pay for a new Chapel for Pembroke College, and had it built by his nephew Christopher Wren – one of his first buildings, consecrated in 1665. Matthew Wren also led the movement to rebuild St Paul's Cathedral after it had been damaged by the Puritans, and again his nephew accomplished the task.

He married Elizabeth, daughter of Thomas Cutler of Ipswich and Sproughton, Suffolk. Matthew Wren’s diary records the event as that he was ‘joined together in happy matrimony.’ Elizabeth was baptised at Ringshall, Suffolk on 17 October. 1604. She was married on 27 February 1621 at Sproughton, Suffolk, to Robert Brownrigg of Ipswich, and had by him two daughters; Elizabeth, baptised 13 January 1623 at Sproughton, died on 31 May 1662 of fen fever, who married Joseph Beaumont, D.D. Master of Peterhouse, and Ann, baptised 19 April 1625 at Sproughton. She married secondly Matthew Wren on 17 August 1628, also at Sproughton.

Of the twelve children whose birth Matthew Wren records in his diary, six died while very young.

 Their eldest son was Matthew Wren (20 August 1629 – 14 June 1672), secretary to the Duke of York
 Francis Wren
Thomas Wren (1632–1679), Archdeacon of Ely
 Sir William Wren (born at Ely House, Holborn 19 March 1638 – 1689), fourth son, of Wilburton, Cambridgeshire and Lincoln's Inn
 Charles Wren (d.1681), m. Dorothy Easton (? Eston) of Norfolk, on 14 January 1663 at Little St. Mary's, Cambridge. He was through his daughter Anne the grandfather of John Monson, 1st Baron Monson (c. 1693 – 18 July 1748), and the Honourable Charles Monson, brother of the 1st Lord Monson, who was elected MP for Lincoln in 1734, 1741 and 1747 and was Deputy Paymaster of His Majesty's Forces until 1745. He died unmarried on 26 August 1764.
 Susan (b. St. Giles in the Fields, London, 25 January 1633 – d.bef.1681), m. Sir Robert Wright, Chief Justice of the King's Bench, the grandmother of Sir James Wright through their son Robert
 Anne, eldest daughter (b. Ipswich 4 September 1630 – d.1707), m. John Ball (d.1686) of St. Paul Covent Garden, Esquire. Anne writes in her will that she wishes her body "to be interred in the grave wherein my dear husband lyes buried in the church of S.t Dunstans in the East", where she was buried on 5 September 1707. Her husband was buried there on 19 April 1686, and he writes in his will that his body is "to bee interrd in the Church of S.t Dunstan in the East in the grave where my ffather and mother lye buried and this to bee performed in the evening". He gives his "deare and welbeloved" wife Anne the same three thousand three hundred pounds that she has to dispose of in her testament, his coach and horses and also the lease of his house in Kingstreete Covent Garden which he held from the Earl of Bedford. He was probably a son or grandson of Richard Ball, son of John Ball of Wellingborow in Northampton, and his wife Anne Burnell (d.1664), the sister of William Burnell of Great Stanmore, Middlesex, gentleman, leatherseller of London, Thomas Burnell, whose wife was called Hester (d.1664), and Katherine Morley, the mother of John Morley of Charlestown and Anne Morley who married Thomas Gate. Richard and Anne had the children Richard and John Ball, Anne, married to James Young of London, merchant, Mary, wife of John Cooke, Barbara, wife of Thomas Reeve, Jane, wife of William Pindar, Margaret Allott, Elizabeth, wife of James Gough, a daughter married to William Robinson, the grandson Richard Cooke and the grandson Thomas Ball, probably son of daughter-in-law Susan. This Anne Ball also writes some fifty years prior on 13 March 1653 that she wishes to be buried in the parish church of St. Dunstans in the East, in London, near to the body of my late husband. The Ball family had a family grave in St. Dunstan-in-the-East where Richard Ball (d.1617), his wife (d.1654) and many of his children and grandchildren were buried. Anne Wren with her husband had the children John Ball and Anne Ball (d.1735). John Ball (d. 5 January 1732), of Hampton Court, Auditor to Prince George of Denmark, 2dW, married 1) his cousin Frances Watts (d.1704), the daughter of Edward Watts and Mary Wren, on 12 July 1700 at St. Mary Magdalen, Old Fish Street, City of London; 2) his cousin Alice Wright (1672 –  17 November 1724), the daughter of Sir Robert Wright and Susan Wren, on 8 April 1706 at St. Stephen Walbrok, City of London. He had four sons, John (b.1701), Edward (1702–1702), George (b.1703) and Francis (b.1704), by his first wife Frances. His will also mentions his grandchildren George and Anna Maria Ball.
 Mary, m. Edward Watts (d.1688) of Tewin in Hertfordshire, and had Anna Maria Watts (d.1744), Frances Watts (d.1704) who married her cousin John Ball, and Dorothy Watts (d.1771) who married Thomas Dunster There is a memorial to Frances and her infant son Edward in St. Mary's Parish Church, Hampton, where all of her children were baptised. Anna Maria and Dorothy lie underneath floor slabs, side by side in the south aisle of Chichester Cathedral.
 Frances
 Alice
 Elizabeth

He died at Ely House, Holborn, on 24 April 1667. His body was brought from London to Cambridge on 9 May and placed in the Schools, and two days later he was buried in the chapel he had built at Pembroke College, Cambridge.

Theology 
Wren was well acquainted with the Dutch Arminian literature. He was himself firmly attached to the Arminian views.

List of appointments
 President of Pembroke College
 Prebendary of Winchester
 Master of Peterhouse, 1625–1634
 Chaplain to the then Prince Charles (later Charles I)
 Vice-Chancellor of the University of Cambridge, 1628–1629
 Dean of Windsor and Wolverhampton
 Registrar of the Order of the Garter
 Clerk of the Closet 1633–36
 Governor of Charterhouse, London
 Bishop of Hereford
 Prebendary of Westminster
 Bishop of Norwich
 Dean of the Chapel Royal, London
 Bishop of Ely (elected 4 April, confirmed 24 April 1638)

Notes and references

Citations

Sources

External links
 
 A Parliamentarian view of him and of his arrest

1585 births
1667 deaths
17th-century Church of England bishops
Alumni of Pembroke College, Cambridge
Arminian ministers
Arminian writers
Bishops of Ely
Bishops of Hereford
Bishops of Norwich
Clerks of the Closet
Deans of Windsor
Fellows of Peterhouse, Cambridge
Masters of Peterhouse, Cambridge
People educated at Merchant Taylors' School, Northwood
Registrars of the Order of the Garter
Vice-Chancellors of the University of Cambridge
16th-century Anglican theologians
17th-century Anglican theologians